Ardenne Castle, or the Royal Castle of Ardenne (Château Royal d'Ardenne, formerly also spelled "Hardenne") was situated in Wallonia in the municipality of Houyet in Belgium not far from Ciergnon Castle and  from Dinant, was a royal castle that served as a luxury hotel from 1891 to 1949. It burned down in 1969.

Royal Residence
On March 21, 1837, King Leopold I of Belgium bought  of land called "Terre d'Hardenne et de Férage". In this domain, crossed by the Lesse and the Ywoigne, he had a rock tower built (1843) and extended an existing hunting lodge with two towers. In the same period, King Leopold I also started the construction of a country house a few kilometers away: the Royal Castle of Ciergnon.
After the enthronement, King Leopold II had his father's manor demolished in 1874 to make way for the new Château Royal d'Ardenne. The building by architect Alphonse Balat was completed in 1891. The gardens were created by the French landscape architect Elie Lainé.

Hotel
Even before he could really use the castle, Leopold completely changed his mind. Instead of a royal country house, Ardenne would become a luxury hotel with 140 rooms. The Château Royal d'Ardenne was an attractive destination that would promote the tourism of the wealthy bourgeoisie to the Ardennes. In 1897-98 a hotel building was erected according to plans by Alban Chambon. It was called annexe but was not less sumptuous than the main building. Each room had unparalleled comfort: bathroom, running water, electric lighting and even telephone. The hotel then also got its own station on the railway line 166: the Halte royale d'Ardenne. The country's first golf course was built there.

The hotel was initially managed by Colonel James North. After his death in 1898 it was leased to the Compagnie Internationale des Grands Hotels, daughter of the Compagnie Internationale des Wagons-Lits (CIWL). After the dissolution of the Compagnie Internationale des Grands Hotels (1907), Colonel Alexis Mols took over the lease. The operation was interrupted by the death of Leopold II in 1909. As a result, the domain, which then already counted 4,200 hectares, ended up in the Royal Trust (Belgium). The hotel was briefly closed but reopened in 1912. In that year, on the advice of King Albert I of Belgium, Mols had founded the Hôtel du Château d'Ardenne à Houyet, which in turn entrusted the operation to the company Les Grands Hôtels Belges, with Georges Marquet as the prominent figure..

Wars
During World War I, the hotel suffered from marauding troops (first French, then German). It was not reopened until 1920. The number of rooms was expanded to 200 (1927) and the domain got its own airport (1929).
Damage in World War II was even worse than the first. Joachim von Ribbentrop housed his headquarters there. After the liberation, the domain was the command post of the American Fifteenth Army, who, however, evacuated it during the Battle of the Bulge. After the war, German prisoners of war worked on the domain for some time.
The Elleboudt-Lemineur couple kept it open for another four years after the war, but the market for luxury tourism from France and England appeared to have dried up. The curtain finally fell in 1949. The furniture was sold to the public (1950) and the rock tower became the Club House of the Royal Golf Club d'Ardenne.

Fire
The castle itself stood empty all this time and burned down in 1968 while roofing was being carried out on behalf of the Royal Trust (Belgium). The garden sculptures were transferred to the Park of Laeken (including Thomas Vinçotte's Seahorses) and the ruins were cleared in the 1970s. Although Chambon's outbuilding had not suffered any damage, it was also demolished. The rock tower was blown up in 1975, so that the Leopold tower is all that remains. It serves as a club house to the Royal Golf Club du Château Royal d'Ardenne.

See also
List of castles in Belgium

External links
Le Château Royal d'Ardenne à Houyet Book from Henri Lemineur 
Royal Golf Club du Château Royal d'Ardenne, www.destinationgolf.be

Royal residences in Belgium
Ardenne
Ardenne
Buildings and structures demolished in 1970
Demolished buildings and structures in Belgium